In broadcasting, sound multiplex is a method to deliver alternative audio feeds on television and radio channels.

Usage
This way, a television or radio channel can carry surround sound (like stereo or 5.1 surround sound), or alternative audio programming where an audio track in different language, alternative sports commentary, or audio description for people with visual impairment can be heard.

Standards

Analogue television
 EIAJ MTS, a standard developed by Electronic Industries Association of Japan (EIAJ) in Japan
 Multichannel television sound (MTS), a standard developed in the United States, and adopted in Argentina, Brazil, Canada, Chile, Mexico, Philippines, Taiwan and United States
 Second audio program (SAP), part of MTS
 Near Instantaneous Companded Audio Multiplex (NICAM), a standard developed in the United Kingdom, and adopted in major European and Asia-Pacific countries
 Zweikanalton ( A2 Stereo), a standard developed in Germany, and mainly adopted in Australia, Austria, Germany, Netherlands, South Korea and Switzerland
Analogue radio
 Subsidiary communications authority (SCA), a standard developed in the United States, and also adopted in Canada
 FMeXtra, a digital application of SCA
 HD Radio, a proprietary digital standard also established and used in the U.S. and Canada

External links
 

Broadcasting
Sound